Filmon Ande (born 10 February 1998) is an Eritrean long-distance runner. 
In 2019, he competed in the senior men's race at the 2019 IAAF World Cross Country Championships held in Aarhus, Denmark. He finished in 22nd place.

In 2017, he competed in the junior men's race at the 2017 IAAF World Cross Country Championships held in Kampala, Uganda. In 2018, he competed in the senior men's race at the 2018 African Cross Country Championships held in Chlef, Algeria.

References

External links 
 

Living people
1998 births
Place of birth missing (living people)
Eritrean male long-distance runners
Eritrean male cross country runners
21st-century Eritrean people